Zany may refer to:

 DJ Zany (born 1974), disc jockey
 Bob Zany (born 1961), American stand-up comedian

Other uses
 A Goofball term, like whacky.

See also
 Zany Brainy, an educational toy store
 Zany Golf, a video game
 Zany Afternoons, a collection of illustrations by Bruce McCall
 Zany Fruits, a breakfast cereal; See List of breakfast cereals
 Zanni, term from which "zany" is derived